Iko were an English rock band from Exeter, Devon, England. Formed in 2005 the band consists of Kieran Scragg (lead vocals and guitar), Neil Reed (keyboards), Rob Maxwell (drums), Darren Harvey-Regan (bass guitar), and Beth Porter (cello).

Scragg and Reed had been members of the just disbanded indie-rock band Buffseeds signed to Fantastic Plastic Records.

In 2007 Iko signed a deal with the Danish record label Copenhagen Records which allowed them to tour the Scandinavian countries.

Iko released two studio albums: I Am Zero (2006), and Ludo Says Hi (2009).

Discography

Albums
2006: I Am Zero
2009: Ludo Says Hi

EPs
2009:  Ctrl Alt Delete

References

English hard rock musical groups
Musical groups established in 2005